Dawood Hercules Corporation Limited (DH Corp.) is a publicly listed investment and holding company headquarterd in Karachi, Pakistan. It operates two subsidiaries, Engro Corporation and EmpiricAI.

History 

In 1968 Dawood Hercules Chemicals Ltd. was formed as a joint venture between DH fertilizer limited and the American company Hercules Inc. The fertilizer plant in Chichoki Mallian, Sheikhupura, Punjab was constructed in 1969. This was the first private sector venture to receive a loan from the World Bank. The factory was the largest ammonia/urea plant in the country at the time.

Dawood Hercules Chemicals remained as a joint venture between the family-driven business and the American partners for over 20 years until the majority takeover in 1990.

In 1997 the Dawood Hercules Chemicals began equity investments in Engro Corporation, and 27% of its shares were acquired.

In 2002 the company expanded its long-term investment in the Engro Corporation. Since then, at least 37% of the shares of Engro are held by DH Corp.

In 2003, the company invested in shares of Sui Northern Gas Pipeline and owned up to 10% of it.

In 2011, the company's fertilizer manufacturing business encountered problems due to the strain in Pakistan's gas supply. It undertook a failed sale of DH Fertilizers to Pakarab Fertilizers. The Dawood Hercules Chemicals was de-merged and became Dawood Hercules Corporation (DH Corp.), a holding company which focuses on investments and Dawood Hercules Fertilizers.

In 2012 DH Corp. acquired shares of Hub Power Company (HUBCO), the first and largest independent power producer in Pakistan with a power generation capacity of 2920 MW.

In 2015, DH Corp. sold its fertilizer manufacturing company to the Fatima Fertilizer Company. The shares of Hubco were sold in 2018.

Leadership 
DH Corp.'s board of directors, according to Pakistan's Companies Act of 2017, comprises 6 non-executive, 3 independent, and 1 executive director.

Inam ur Rahman joined DH Corp.'s board in December 2016 as company's chief executive officer.
 
Chairman of the board of directors:
 Ahmed Dawood, 1968 - 2002
 Hussain Dawood, 2002–present

Vice Chairman of the board of directors:
 J. M. Eagen, 1973 
 Gordon M. Hoffmann, 1975 - 1979
 Walter H. Duncan, 1981 - 1988
 Arden B. Engebretsen, 1989 - 1990
 Shahzada Dawood, since 2018–present

Shareholding 
DH Corp. is a public listed family-owned company on the Pakistan Stock Exchange (PSX). It is traded on the PSX under the symbol DAWH. The number of shares of DAWH are 481,287,116. It has received domestic entity rating by the Pakistan Credit Rating Agency Limited (PACRA), Long Term: AA and Short Term: A1+. DH Corp. is one of four companies that collectively control 19.3% of the total market capitalization on the Pakistan Stock Exchange (PSX).

Subsidiaries 
DH Corp. directly governs financially and operationally over its two subsidiaries, Engro Corporation and EmpiricAI, and holds, through the majority of voting rights, the decision-making power at the companies' boards of directors.

Engro Corporation is a conglomerate with subsidiaries itself. Its activities span from production of fertilizers, foods, chemicals to energy, petrochemicals and telecommunication infrastructure.

EmpiricAI, founded in June 2020, develops Industrial Internet of Things (IIoT) and Artificial intelligence for the industrial sector.

Associated Companies 
Through common directorship of DH Corp. are the following companies associated with it:

Cyan, the former Central Insurance Company got renamed in 2011, is an equity investment company. As a public listed company Cyan invests in companies with high growth potential. The company's three main principal lines of business include investment in public equities, equity investment in private companies, and strategic advisory services.

Inbox Business Technologies had initially started its operations as a computer assembly business in 2001. Inbox has partnerships with leading global IT companies which include  Huawei, Oracle, and Microsoft corporation. It is the largest domestic revenue-generating IT company.

Dawood Lawrencepur Limited (DLL), used to be a leading textile company with factories in Burewala and Karachi but shut its textile business and was restyled in 2004 to become a holding company for two renewable energy projects.

Tenaga Generasi Limited (TGL), a Malaysian company, incorporated in Pakistan in 2004 to implement a 50MW wind power plant. TGL runs a wind power plant in Sindh and was acquired by DLL in 2008.

Reon Energy is DLL's subsidiary actively engaged in solar power, energy storage, electric vehicle charging and digitization of energy assets. Reon is one of Pakistan's leading industrial renewable energy specialist. Its portfolio includes cement, oil and gas, coal mining, steel, textile, dairy, and telecommunications.

Philanthropy 
DH Corp.'s philanthropic efforts are in an array of social welfare activities, which are  managed  through The Dawood Foundation (TDF). TDF was established as an educational foundation whose primary focus was to support and promote educational initiatives in the fields of Science, Technology, and Research.

The Dawood Hercules Corporation has been an engaged member of the World Economic Forum since 1992.

Chairman Hussain Dawood on behalf of Engro, Dawood Hercules and his family pledged on 2 April 2020 to donate 1 billion Pakistani rupee (PKR) to fight against the COVID-19 pandemic in Pakistan.

See also
List of largest companies in Pakistan

References

Conglomerate companies established in 1968
Conglomerate companies of Pakistan
Companies based in Karachi
Companies listed on the Pakistan Stock Exchange
Dawood Hercules Corporation
Pakistani companies established in 1968
Joint ventures
Hercules Inc.